Petrarca-Preis was a European literary and translation award named after the Italian  Renaissance poet Francesco Petrarca or Petrarch. Founded in 1975 by German art historian and publisher Hubert Burda, it was primarily designed for contemporary European poets, but some occasional non-Europeans appear in the list of laureates. 

The award was first distributed over a twenty-year period (1975–95) and included the categories Literature and Translation. Then it was followed for a decade (1999–2009) by a Hermann-Lenz-Preis and resumed in 2010. The first jury consisted of fluxus participant Bazon Brock, poets Michael Krüger and Nicolas Born, and novelist Peter Handke. When the prize resumed in 2010, Peter Handke and Michael Krüger still were on the jury, together with the authors Alfred Kolleritsch (himself awarded in 1978) and Peter Hamm. "We want to support a national and regional culture in Europe", founder Hubert Burda initially said at the 2011 awards. An explicit goal was to watch out all over Europe for authors who gave a distinctive voice to their prevailing culture. The Petrarca-Preis consisted of €20,000, and it could be shared between several winners. The ceremony was usually held in places which Francesco Petrarch at some point visited.

Literature prize-winners and ceremony locations

 1975 Rolf Dieter Brinkmann (posthumously), Mont Ventoux
 1976 Sarah Kirsch and Ernst Meister, Arquà Petrarca
 1977 Herbert Achternbusch (who declined), Arquà Petrarca
 1978 Alfred Kolleritsch, Siena
 1979 Zbigniew Herbert, Verona
 1980 Ludwig Hohl, Florence
 1981 Tomas Tranströmer, Vicenza
 1982 Ilse Aichinger, Sils Maria
 1983 Gerhard Meier, Vézelay
 1984 Gustav Januš, Avignon
 1987 Hermann Lenz, Asolo
 1988 Philippe Jaccottet, Trieste
 1989 Jan Skácel, Lucca
 1990 Paul Wühr, Siena
 1991 John Berger, Piemonte
 1992 Michael Hamburger, Modena
 1993 Gennadij Ajgi, Perugia
 1994 Helmut Färber, Weimar
 1995 Les Murray, Provence
 2010 Pierre Michon and Erri De Luca, Salem Abbey
 2011 John Burnside and Florjan Lipuš, Benediktbeuern Abbey
 2012 Miodrag Pavlović and Kito Lorenc, Marbach am Neckar
 2013 Adonis and Robin Robertson, München
 2014 Franz Mon and Tomas Venclova, Bayerisches Nationalmuseum, München

Translator Award 
 1987 Hanno Helbling
 1988 Georg Rudolf Lind
 1989 Felix Philipp Ingold
 1990 Fabjan Hafner
 1991 Ilma Rakusa
 1993 Hanns Grössel
 1994 Elisabeth Edl and Wolfgang Matz
 1995 Verena Reichel

References

Further reading

External links
 

Translation awards
German literary awards
Petrarch